Acinodrillia is a genus of sea snails, marine gastropod mollusks in the family Drilliidae.

Description
The length of the claviform shell varies between 7mm and 12 mm. The spiral sculpture of the shell shows sharply incised grooves, carving through the axial ribs into distinct nodules or granules. These axial ribs disappear below the suture. Contrary to the species in Drillia, the anal sinus is not spout-like. Contrary to Agladrillia, the outer lip is not pinched in toward the base of the shell. The body whorl shows a dorsal varix (a subcylíndrical protrusion). The wide siphonal canal is unnotched.

Distribution
This marine genus is endemic to South Africa.

Species
Species within the genus Acinodrillia include:

 Acinodrillia amazimba Kilburn, 1988
 Acinodrillia paula (Thiele, 1925)
 Acinodrillia viscum Kilburn, 1988

References

 Kilburn, R. N. (1988). Type species designation for Acinodrillia Kilburn. Annals of the Natal Museum. 29: 557.

External links
 WMSDB - Worldwide Mollusc Species Data Base: family Drilliidae

 
Drilliidae
Gastropod genera